The Ministry of Local Government Development, abbreviated KPKT, is a ministry of the Government of Malaysia that is responsible for urban well-being, housing, local government, town planning, country planning, fire and rescue authority, landscape, solid waste management, strata management, moneylenders, pawnbrokers.

Organisation
 Minister of Local Government Development
 Deputy Minister of Local Government Development
 Secretary-General
 Under the Authority of Secretary-General
 Legal Division
 Corporate Communication Unit
 Internal Audit Unit
 Key Performance Indicator Unit
 Integrity Unit
 Deputy Secretary-General (Policy and Development)
 Project Development and Implementation Division
 Policy and Inspectorate Division
 Secretariat and International Relations Division
 Deputy Secretary-General (Urban Wellbeing)
 Urban Wellbeing Division
 Urbanization Service Division
 Moneylenders and Pawnbrokers Division
 Deputy Secretary-General (Management)
 Finance and Procurement Division
 Information Technology Division
 Management Services Division
 Human Resources Division
 Account Division

Federal departments
 Fire and Rescue Department of Malaysia, or Jabatan Bomba dan Penyelamat Malaysia. (Official site)
 Local Government Department, or Jabatan Kerajaan Tempatan (JKT). (Official site)
 National Housing Department, or Jabatan Perumahan Negara. (Official site)
 National Solid Waste Management Department (NSWMD), or Jabatan Pengurusan Sisa Pepejal Negara (JPSPN). (Official site)

Federal agencies
 Tribunal for Housing and Strata Management, or Tribunal Perumahan Dan Pengurusan Strata (TPPS). 
 Urban Wellbeing, Housing and Local Government Training Institute, or Institut Latihan Kesejahteraan Bandar, Perumahan dan Kerajaan Tempatan (I-KPKT). (Official site)
 Solid Waste And Public Cleansing Management Corporation (SWCorp), or Perbadanan Pengurusan Sisa Pepejal Dan Pembersihan Awam (PPSPPA). (Official site)

Key legislation
The Ministry of Local Government Development is responsible for administration of several key Acts:
Housing
 Housing Development (Control and Licensing) Act 1966 [Act 118]
 Building and Common Property (Maintenance and Management) Act 2007 [Act 663]
 Strata Management Act 2013 [Act 757]
Local Government
 Local Government Act 1976 [Act 171]
 Street, Drainage and Building Act 1974 [Act 133]
Solid Waste Management and Public Cleansing
 Solid Waste and Public Cleansing Management Act 2007 [Act 672]
 Solid Waste and Public Cleansing Management Corporation Act 2007 [Act 673]
Town and Country Planning
 Town and Country Planning Act 1976 [Act 172]
 Town Planners Act 1995 [Act 538]
Fire and Rescue Authority
 Fire Services Act 1988 [Act 341]
Moneylenders and Pawnbrokers
 Moneylenders Act 1951 [Act 400]
 Pawnbrokers Act 1972 [Act 81]

Policy Priorities of the Government of the Day
 National Landscape Policy
 National Housing Policy
 National Affordable Housing Policy
 National Urbanization Policy
 National Physical Plan
 National Solid Waste Management Policy
 National Cleanliness Policy
 National Community Policy

Programmes
 National Blue Ocean Strategy (NBOS), or Strategi Lautan Biru Kebangsaan
 My Beautiful Neighbourhood (MyBN), or Kejiranan Indah
 My Beautiful Malaysia (MyBM), or Malaysiaku Indah
 Youth Housing Scheme (MyYouth), or Skim Perumahan Belia
 Urban Planning, or Kesejahteraan Bandar
 Centre of Excellence (COE), or Pusat Kecemerlangan
 1Malaysia Maintenance Fund, or Tabung Penyelenggaraan 1Malaysia (TP1M)
 Housing Loan Scheme (HLS), or Skim Pinjaman Perumahan (SPP)
 Housing Maintenance Program, or Program Penyelenggaraan Perumahan (PPP)
 People's Housing Project, or Projek Perumahan Rakyat (PPR)
 Private Affordable Housing Scheme (MyHome), or Skim Perumahan Mampu Milik Swasta
 Transit House Program , or Program Rumah Transit
 Solid Waste, or Sisa Pepejal
 Waste to Energy (WTE), or Sisa kepada Tenaga
 Separation at Source (SAS), or Pengasingan Sisa Pepejal di Punca
 Urban Wellbeing
 Residents Representative Committee, or Jawatankuasa Perwakilan Penduduk (JPP)
 Residents Representative Council, or Majlis Perwakilan Penduduk (MPP)
 Moneylenders and Pawnbrokers
 Moneylenders Advertisement Licenses and Permits, or Lesen dan Permit Iklan Pemberi Pinjam Wang
 Pawnbrokers Advertisement Licenses and Permits, or Lesen dan Permit Iklan Pemegang Pajak Gadai

See also
Minister of Local Government Development

References

External links
Ministry of Local Government Development official website

Federal ministries, departments and agencies of Malaysia
Malaysia
Malaysia
Urban planning in Malaysia
Housing in Malaysia
Local government in Malaysia
Ministries established in 2013
2013 establishments in Malaysia